Igreja Nova means "New Church" in Portuguese and may refer to:

Igreja Nova, Alagoas, a city in Alagoas, Brazil
Igreja Nova (Barcelos), a parish in Barcelos Municipality, Portugal
Igreja Nova (Mafra), a parish in the Mafra Municipality, Portugal